The Filmfare East Best Female Playback Singer Award is given by Indian film magazine Filmfare as a part of its annual Filmfare Awards for Bengali films, to recognise a female playback singer who has delivered an outstanding performance in a film song.

Superlatives

Anwesha Datta Gupta was the first holder of this award back in 2014 for the song "Saradin Aar Sara Raat" from Rupkotha Noy. Iman Chakraborty won the award on the second edition in 2017.
Shreya Ghoshal holds the record for most nominations (5), Oldest nominee. Shreya Ghoshal also holds the record for most nominations without ever winning (5).
Both Anwesha Datta Gupta, Iman Chakraborty and Chandrani Banerjee have won the award one time.

Most Wins

Multiple Nominees

List of winners

2010s
 2014 Anwesha Datta Gupta - "Saradin Aar Sara Raat" - Rupkatha Noy
 Somlata Acharyya Chowdhury - "Tumi Ebar" - Maach Mishti & More
 Anwesha Datta Gupta - "Roshni Elo" - Proloy
 Shreya Ghoshal - "Balir Shohor" - Mishawr Rawhoshyo
 Ujjaini Mukherjee - "Ami Akash Khola" - Aborto
 2017 Iman Chakraborty - "Tumi Jaake Bhalobasho" - Praktan
 Anwesha Datta Gupta - "Dhoya Tulsi Pata" - Chocolate
 Shreya Ghoshal - "Tomar Ki Naam" - Shaheb Bibi Golaam
 Shreya Ghoshal - "Kolkata" - Praktan
 Shreya Ghoshal - "Tomake Chuye Dilam" - Bastu-Shaap
 2018 Chandrani Banerjee - "Tomake Bujhina Priyo" - Projapoti Biskut
 Iman Chakraborty - "Bhalo Koira Bajao Go" - Durga Sohay
 Lagnajita Chakraborty - "E Bhabe Golpo Hok" - Bibaho Diaries
 Nikhita Gandhi - "Tomra Ekhono Ki" - Meghnad Badh Rahasya
  Sharmin Sultana Sumi - "Ahare Jibon" - Doob
 Shreya Ghoshal - "Tui Chunli Jakhan" - Samantaral

See also
 Filmfare Awards
 Bollywood
 Cinema of India

External links
 Official site

Female Playback
Indian music awards
Music awards honoring women